Pane or Panes may refer to:

 Paned window (architecture), a window that is divided into sections known as "panes"
 Paned window (computing), elements of a graphical display
 Pane (mythology), a type of satyr-like creature from Greek mythology
 Pane di Altamura, type of bread made from  flour from the Altamura area of the Provincia di Bari, in the South East of Italy
 Panes, Asturias, one of eight parishes in Peñamellera Baja, a municipality within the province and autonomous community of Asturias, in northern Spain.

People
Pane
Armijn Pane (1908–1970), an Indonesian author. Also known as Adinata, A. Soul, Empe, A. Mada, A. Banner and Kartono
Gina Pane (1939–1990), French artist of Italian origins
Irma Pane, Indonesian American pop singer
Karen W. Pane, American administrator, former Assistant Secretary for Policy and Planning at the Department of Veterans Affairs
Lafran Pane (1922–1991), Indonesian academic 
Luigi Pane, Italian director and video artist
Mauro Pane (1963–2014), Italian driver, kart driver champion
Michele Pane (1876–1953), Italian American symbolist poet and journalist
Mikill Pane (born 1985), English rapper
Sanusi Pane (1905–1968), Indonesian writer, journalist, and historian
Panes
Michael Panes (born 1963), American actor, writer, musician and composer
Roger Panes (1933–1974), British member of the Exclusive branch of the Plymouth Brethren. In 1974 he killed his wife and three children with an axe before hanging himself
Roo Panes (born 1988), British singer-songwriter

See also
 Pain (disambiguation)
 Pan (disambiguation)
 Panel (disambiguation)